is an island located in Ise Bay off the east coast of central Honshu, Japan. It is administered as part of the city of Toba in Mie Prefecture. 

Kozukumi-jima is uninhabited. It has been regarded as a sacred island to the Shinto religion since ancient times, and commercial fishing in its adjacent waters is prohibited. Archaeologists have found the remains of stone sanctuaries, which has been designated as a Hachiman Shrine by local fishermen, who hold a ceremony on the island annually on July 11. Other than this occasion, landing on the island is forbidden.

See also

 Desert island
 List of islands

External links

Toba City homepage

Islands of Mie Prefecture
Uninhabited islands of Japan